Bryan Brock is a former American football quarterback who played three seasons in the Arena Football League with the Dallas Texans, Columbus Thunderbolts and Orlando Predators. He played college football at Texas Tech University.

References

External links
Just Sports Stats
College stats

Living people
Year of birth missing (living people)
American football quarterbacks
Texas Tech Red Raiders football players
Dallas Texans (Arena) players
Cleveland Thunderbolts players
Orlando Predators players